Thomas Edwin Mix (born Thomas Hezikiah Mix; January 6, 1880 – October 12, 1940) was an American film actor and the star of many early Western films between 1909 and 1935. He appeared in 291 films, all but nine of which were silent films. He was Hollywood's first Western star and helped define the genre as it emerged in the early days of the cinema.

Early years 
He grew up in nearby DuBois, where his father, a stable master for a wealthy lumber merchant, taught him to ride and love horses. He spent time working on a local farm owned by John DuBois, a lumber businessman.

In April 1898, during the Spanish–American War, Mix enlisted in the Army under the name Thomas E. (Edwin) Mix. His unit never went overseas, and Mix later failed to return for duty after an extended furlough when he married Grace I. Allin on July 18, 1902. Mix was listed as AWOL on November 4, 1902, but was never court-martialed. His marriage to Allin was annulled after one year. In 1905, Mix married Kitty Jewel Perinne, and this marriage also ended within a year. He next married Olive Stokes on January 10, 1909, in Medora, North Dakota. On July 13, 1912, Olive gave birth to their daughter Ruth.

In 1905, Mix rode in President Theodore Roosevelt's inaugural parade with a group of 50 horsemen led by Seth Bullock, which included several former Rough Riders. Years later, Hollywood publicists muddled this event to imply that Mix had been a Rough Rider himself.

Mix went to Oklahoma and lived in Guthrie, working as a bartender and other odd jobs. He was briefly night marshal of Dewey, in 1911. He worked at the Miller Brothers 101 Ranch, one of the largest ranching businesses in the United States, covering , hence its name. The ranch had its own touring Wild West show in which Mix appeared. He stood out as a skilled horseman and expert shot, winning national riding and roping contests at Prescott, Arizona, in 1909, and Canon City, Colorado, in 1910.

Mix was a Freemason.

Film career

Selig Polyscope 

Mix began his film career as a supporting cast member with the Selig Polyscope Company. His first appearance was in a short film, The Cowboy Millionaire, released on October 21, 1909. In 1910, he appeared as himself in a short documentary film, Ranch Life in the Great Southwest, in which he displayed his skills as a cattle wrangler. Shot in Dewey, Oklahoma with Selig studio cameramen, the film was a success, and Mix became an early motion picture star.

Mix performed in more than 100 films for Selig, many of which were filmed in Las Vegas, New Mexico. While with Selig he co-starred in several films with Victoria Forde, and they fell in love. He divorced Olive Stokes in 1917. By then, Selig Polyscope had encountered severe financial difficulties, and Mix and Forde both subsequently signed with Fox Film Corporation, which had leased the Edendale studio. They married in 1918 and had a daughter, Thomasina (Tommie) Mix, in February 1922.

Mixville 

Mix made more than 160 cowboy films throughout the 1920s. These featured action-oriented scripts contrasted with the documentary style of his work with Selig. Heroes and villains were sharply defined and a clean-cut cowboy always saved the day. Millions of American children grew up watching his films on Saturday afternoons. His horse, "Tony the Wonder Horse", also became a celebrity. Mix did his own stunts and was frequently injured.

In 1913, Mix moved his family to a ranch he purchased in Prescott named Bar Circle A Ranch. Some of his movies were filmed in his Prescott home. During this time, Mix had success in the local Prescott Frontier Days rodeo, which claims to be the "world's oldest rodeo". In 1920, he took first prize in a bull-riding contest. The Bar Circle A Ranch has been developed into a planned community called Yavapai Hills, where there is a street named Bar Circle A Road.

Mix's salary at Fox reached $7,500 a week. Gossip columnist Louella Parsons wrote that he had his initials in electric lights on the top of his house. His performances were realistic with action stunts, horseback riding, attention-grabbing cowboy costumes, and showmanship. At the Edendale lot, Mix built a  shooting set called Mixville. Loaded with western props and furnishings, it has been described as a "complete frontier town, with a dusty street, hitching rails, a saloon, jail, bank, doctor's office, surveyor's office, and the simple frame houses typical of the early Western era". Near the back of the lot an Indian village of lodges was ringed by miniature plaster mountains. The set also included a simulated desert, a large corral, and (to facilitate interior shots) a ranch house with no roof.

Mix threatened to move to Argentina to make films or to join the circus, but eventually he signed with FBO, which he then left for Universal after salary disputes with FBO studio head Joseph P. Kennedy. He called Kennedy a "tight-assed, money-crazy son of a bitch".

Mix became friends with Wyatt Earp, who lived in Los Angeles and occasionally visited Hollywood western movie sets. He was a pallbearer at Earp's funeral in January 1929.  The newspapers reported that Mix cried during his friend's service.

1930s 
Mix appeared with the Sells-Floto Circus in 1929, 1930, and 1931 at a reported weekly salary of $20,000. He and Forde divorced in 1931. Meanwhile, the Great Depression (along with the actor's free-spending ways and many wives) reportedly had wiped out most of his savings. In 1932, he married his fifth wife, Mabel Hubbell Ward. Universal Pictures approached him that year with an offer to perform in "talkies," which included script and cast approval. He acted in nine films for Universal, but because of injuries he received while filming, he was reluctant to do any more. Mix then appeared with the Sam B. Dill circus, which he reportedly bought two years later (1935).

Mix's last screen appearance was a 15-episode sound Mascot Pictures serial, The Miracle Rider (1935); he received $40,000 for the four weeks of filming. Outdoor action sequences for the production were filmed primarily on the Iverson Movie Ranch in Chatsworth, California, on the outskirts of Los Angeles. The site was known for its huge sandstone boulders, and one of them later became known as Tom Mix Rock when it was discovered it had been used in The Miracle Rider. In one episode, Mix was filmed descending from the top of the rock, with boot holes carved into it to assist him in making the descent. The rock and the boot holes, although unmarked, is in the Garden of the Gods park in Chatsworth.

Also in 1935, Texas governor James V. Allred named Mix an honorary Texas Ranger. Mix returned to circus performing, now with his eldest daughter Ruth, who appeared in some of his films. In 1938, he went to Europe on a promotional trip, leaving Ruth behind to manage the circus. Without him, however, the circus soon failed, and he later excluded her from his will. Mix had reportedly made over $6 million (equivalent to $ million in ) during his 26-year film career.

Radio 

In 1933, Ralston Purina obtained his permission to produce the radio series Tom Mix Ralston Straight Shooters, which, but for one year during World War II, was popular throughout most of the 1930s through the early 1950s, well after Mix's death. Mix never appeared on these broadcasts (his voice, damaged by a bullet to the throat and repeated broken noses, was not fit for radio) and was instead played by radio actors: Artells Dickson (early 1930s), Jack Holden (from 1937), Russell Thorsen (early 1940s) and Joe "Curley" Bradley (from 1944). Others in the supporting cast included George Gobel, Harold Peary and Willard Waterman.

The Ralston company offered ads during the radio program for listeners to send in for a series of 12 special Ralston–Tom Mix comic books available only by writing the Ralston Company by mail.

Most of Mix's radio work has been lost over the years; recordings of only approximately 30 scattered episodes, and no complete story arcs, survive.

Death 

On October 12, 1940, after visiting Pima County Sheriff Ed Echols in Tucson, Arizona, Mix headed north towards Phoenix on U.S. Highway 80 (now Arizona State Route 79) About eighteen miles (29 km) south of Florence, Mix came upon construction barriers at a bridge washed away by a flash flood. Unable to stop in time, his car swerved twice, then overturned in a gully. A large aluminum suitcase containing money, traveler's checks, and jewels, situated on the package shelf behind his head, hurtled forward and fatally struck him, breaking his neck. He was 60 years old.

His funeral took place at the Little Church of the Flowers in Glendale, California, on October 16, 1940, and was attended by thousands of people. He is buried in the Forest Lawn Memorial Park Cemetery.

A small stone memorial marks the site of his death on State Route 79, and the nearby gully is known as "Tom Mix Wash". The marker bears the inscription: "In memory of Tom Mix, whose spirit left his body on this spot and whose characterization and portrayals in life served to better fix memories of the old West in the minds of living men."

Legacy 

Tom Mix was the acknowledged "King of Cowboys" when Ronald Reagan and John Wayne were young, and the influence of his screen persona can be seen in their approach to portraying cowboys. When an injury caused football player Marion Morrison (later known as John Wayne) to drop out of the University of Southern California, Mix helped him find work moving props in the back lot of Fox Studios. That was the beginning of Wayne's Hollywood career.

Mix made 291 movies throughout his career. As of 2007, only about 10% of these were known to be available for viewing, though it is unclear how many are now considered lost films. The 1937 Fox vault fire lost most of the archive of his films made with Fox.

For his contribution to the motion picture industry, Mix has a star on the Hollywood Walk of Fame at 1708 Vine Street. His cowboy boot prints, palm prints and the hoof prints of his horse, Tony, are at Grauman's Chinese Theatre, at 6925 Hollywood Boulevard. In 1958 Mix was inducted posthumously into the Western Performers Hall of Fame at the National Cowboy & Western Heritage Museum in Oklahoma City, Oklahoma. In 1959, a "Monument to the Stars" was erected on Beverly Drive (where it intersects Olympic Boulevard and becomes Beverwil) in Beverly Hills. The memorial consists of a bronze-green spiral of sprocketed "camera film" above a multi-sided tower, embossed with full-length likenesses of early stars who appeared in famous silent movies. Those memorialized include Douglas Fairbanks, Mary Pickford, Will Rogers, Conrad Nagel, Rudolph Valentino, Fred Niblo, Harold Lloyd, and Mix. There is also a Tom Mix museum in Dewey, Oklahoma. Additionally, from 1986 to 2002 there existed another museum in his birthplace of Mix Run, Pennsylvania. Between 1980 and 2004, 21 Tom Mix festivals were held during the month of September, most of them in DuBois, Pennsylvania.

Comic book appearances 

Tom Mix was often portrayed in comic books, primarily during the heyday of Western-themed comics, the 1940s and 1950s.

He was first featured in 11 issues of Dell Comics' The Comics from 1937 to 1938.

The Ralston Purina Company, a sponsor of the radio series, produced nine issues of Tom Mix Comics in 1940–1941, and three issues of Tom Mix Commandos Comics in 1942. The 36-page comics were available by mail order, for two boxtops of any Ralston cereal.

Fawcett Comics published 61 issues of Tom Mix Western from 1948 to 1953.

Comics featuring Tom Mix were also published in Sweden, Germany, Canada, Australia, and Great Britain, including L. Miller & Son's Tom Mix Western Comics, which ran 85 issues from 1948 to 1951.

Cultural references 

 Bruce Cockburn in his song Nicaragua refers to Augusto César Sandino wearing a Tom Mix hat.
 Bruce Willis played Tom Mix in the 1988 Blake Edwards film Sunset, with James Garner as Wyatt Earp. The film was very loosely based on the fact that Earp and Mix knew each other when Earp was serving as a consultant during the silent film era.
 Daryl Ponicsan's novel Tom Mix Died for Your Sins (1975) evokes Mix's life and personality.
 Clifford Irving offered a pseudo-autobiographical version of Mix's early adulthood, drawing him as a brash young gringo who befriends and then joins up with the Mexican revolutionary Pancho Villa in the novel Tom Mix and Pancho Villa (1982).
 In the 1998 film Smoke Signals, the Native protagonists Victor and Thomas have their seats taken by two white men. They then discuss how the cowboys always win. They discuss Tom Mix and John Wayne, and wind up singing a song about John Wayne's teeth, and how they are never visible in his movies. 
 A resurrected Mix appeared in two of Philip José Farmer's Riverworld novels, The Dark Design (1977) and The Magic Labyrinth (1980), as a traveling companion of Jack London, along with a short story featured in the anthology Riverworld and Other Stories (1979).
 The ghost of Tom Mix haunted a Hollywood couple in the supernatural thriller The Ghosts of Edendale (2004).
 The United States Postal Service has commemorated Mix on a first-class mail postage stamp.
 There is a street named Tom Mix Trail in Prescott, Arizona and many streets in the Yavapai Hills neighborhood are named after Tom Mix's movies.
 In the 2008 Clint Eastwood film Changeling, the "imposter" son of Angelina Jolie's character cites meeting and riding Tom Mix's horse as his motive for concocting his false story.
 In the 2010 Boardwalk Empire episode "The Emerald City", Nucky Thompson's servant Eddie Kessler offers to frisk someone who's come to see him. Nucky chides him: "You're Tom Mix all of a sudden?"
 In the 2014 Netflix show Peaky Blinders Season 2, Episode 3, Tommy Shelby interviews a prospective fall guy for his gang who is partial to homemade western garb and asks "Spend a lotta time at the pictures eh? Cowboy pictures, Tom Mix, Yeah?"
 The American artist Robert Ecker has incorporated Mix's trademark ten-gallon hat and his image in several works, including End of an Era (mezzotint, 1982) and Persistence of Imagery #25 (painting, 2013).
 In the season five episode entitled "Mulcahy's War" of the television series M*A*S*H, Father Mulcahy performs an emergency tracheotomy on an injured soldier with his Tom Mix pocketknife.
 An image of Mix appears prominently on the cover of the Beatles' 1967 album Sgt. Pepper's Lonely Hearts Club Band.
 In the film Tombstone, starring Kurt Russell and Val Kilmer, during the closing credits reference is made to the fact that "Tom Mix wept" at Wyatt Earp's funeral.
 A passing reference is made about Mix in Season 3, Episode 2 of Downton Abbey.
 In the first episode of The Beverly Hillbillies, Jed Clampett mentions that he likes Tom Mix.

Filmography

References

Further reading

External links 

 
 
 B-Westerns
 Tom Mix photographs
 Iverson Movie Ranch
 
 
 Tom Mix Museum

1880 births
1940 deaths
People from Cameron County, Pennsylvania
American children's radio programs
American Freemasons
American male film actors
American male silent film actors
Male actors from Pennsylvania
Road incident deaths in Arizona
United States Army soldiers
Male Western (genre) film actors
Wild West show performers
20th-century American male actors
Burials at Forest Lawn Memorial Park (Glendale)
20th Century Studios contract players
Deserters